Liquid carbon dioxide is the liquid state of carbon dioxide, which cannot occur under atmospheric pressure. It can only exist at a pressure above , under  (temperature of critical point) and above  (temperature of triple point). Low-temperature carbon dioxide is commercially used in its solid form, commonly known as "dry ice". The uses and applications of liquid carbon dioxide include decaffeinating coffee, extracting virgin olive oil from olive paste, in fire extinguishers, and as a coolant.

Properties

Liquid carbon dioxide is a type of liquid which is formed from highly compressed and cooled gaseous carbon dioxide. It does not form under atmospheric conditions. It only exists when the pressure is above 5.1 atm and the temperature is under  (temperature of critical point) and above  (temperature of triple point). The chemical symbol remains the same as gaseous carbon dioxide.

At this temperature, the pressure is measured in a range from 15 to 60 atmospheres.

Uses 

Uses of liquid carbon dioxide include the preservation of food, in fire extinguishers, and in commercial food processes. For food preservation, liquid carbon dioxide is used to refrigerate, preserve, store and soften. The liquid carbon dioxide not only reduces combustion by displacing oxygen, but also cools the burning surface to avoid further damage. Solvent extraction using compressed liquid  can be used in industrial processes such as removing caffeine from coffee or improving the yield of olive oil production.

Liquid carbon dioxide is being considered as a means of CO2 transportation for underground or subsea storage purposes. Due to its high density as a liquid, it is much more feasible to ship than as a gas.

See also 
Other chemical compounds and elements are commonly used for commercial and research purposes in their liquid state:
Liquid oxygen
Liquid nitrogen
Liquid helium
Liquid hydrogen

References

Carbon dioxide